Kara-Kudyur (Kara-Kuĵur) is a rural locality (a selo) in Ulagansky District, the Altai Republic, Russia. The population was 344 as of 2016. There are 4 streets.

Geography 
Kara-Kudyur is located 13 km northwest of Ulagan (the district's administrative centre) by road. Chibilya is the nearest rural locality.

References 

Rural localities in Ulagansky District